Thomas Martin Dunn (September 1, 1836 – April 4, 1916) was an American physician and politician who served in the Virginia House of Delegates and Virginia Senate.

References

External links 

1836 births
1916 deaths
Democratic Party members of the Virginia House of Delegates
19th-century American politicians
20th-century American politicians